Edwaleni Solar Power Station, is a 100 megawatts solar power plant under construction in Eswatini. The solar farm is under development by Frazium Energy, a subsidiary of the Frazer Solar Group, an Australian-German conglomerate. The solar component is complemented by a battery energy storage system, expected to be the largest in Africa. The energy off-taker is Eswatini Electricity Company (EEC), the national electricity utility parastatal company, under a 40-year power purchase agreement (PPA). EEC plans to inject the energy into the Southern Africa Power Pool, for use primarily in South Africa.

Location
The power station is located in the town of Matsapha, in Manzini Region, in central Eswatini. The solar farm sits adjacent to the government-owned 15 megawatts '''Edwaleni Hydroelectric Power Station.

Overview
The power station is owned and is being developed by Frazium Energy from Germany. The solar component will be attached to a large battery energy storage system, described as the "largest project of its kind in Africa". The ultimate beneficiary is intended to be the South African electricity grid, through the Southern African Power Pool, over a 40-year period, according to an existing PPA.

Cost and timeline
The cost of construction is reported to be US$115 million (approx. €98.8 million). Commercial commissioning is anticipated in the second half of 2022.

See also

 List of power stations in Eswatini

References

External links
 Eswatini: Power Africa Fact Sheet As of May 2022.

Power stations in Eswatini
Proposed energy infrastructure